Vladislav Romanovich Masternoy (born 17 November 1995) is a Russian football player. He plays for FC Fakel Voronezh.

Club career
He made his debut in the Russian Professional Football League for FC Spartak-2 Moscow on 22 August 2013 in a game against FC Zvezda Ryazan.

He made his Russian Football National League debut for FC Fakel Voronezh on 7 July 2019 in a game against FC Torpedo Moscow.

Masternoy made his Russian Premier League debut for Fakel on 17 July 2022 against FC Krasnodar.

Career statistics

References

External links

1995 births
Sportspeople from Pskov
Living people
Russian footballers
Russia youth international footballers
Association football midfielders
FC Spartak-2 Moscow players
FC Avangard Kursk players
FC Armavir players
FC Fakel Voronezh players
Russian Second League players
Russian First League players
Russian Premier League players